The Murchison River is the second longest river in Western Australia. The Murchison-Yalgar-Hope river system is the longest river system in Western Australia. It has a mean annual flow of 208gigalitres, although in 2006, the peak year on record since 1967, flow was 1,806gigalitres.

Basin
Rain generally falls in the upper basin during summer cyclones, so for much of the year the Murchison River does not flow, leaving a dry sandy river bed and intermittent permanent pools.

The eastern reaches of the basin contain large chains of salt lakes, which flow only following rainfall. From here the river flows west, then southwest, then west to the Indian Ocean.

Within the basin are the towns of Kalbarri and Meekatharra; the hamlets of Ajana, Binnu, Barrel Well and Murchison; and the mining ghost towns of Galena, Geraldine, Abbotts, Chesterfield, Yaloginda, Reedy, Nannine, Quinns, Burnakura and Gabanintha.

Course
Another  to the south-southwest it joins another important tributary, the Sanford River. It then flows to the southwest, flowing under the North West Coastal Highway at the Galena Bridge. Entering the Kalbarri National Park, it flows first to the northwest and then to the north, flowing through the Murchison Gorge, and passing through a number of tight bends known as the Z Bend and The Loop respectively. It eventually turns to the southwest, passing through one more dogleg before discharging into the Indian Ocean at Kalbarri, the only town on the river.

Murchison Gorge
Murchison Gorge is a deep gorge in near pristine condition. It is popular with tourists, and there are a number of tourist lookouts. It is also of geological interest, as it exposes a section through the Tumblagooda Sandstone, a geological sequence rich in Ordovician trace fossils.  The maximum age for the initiation of major down-cutting of the Murchison Gorge, as a response to regional Quaternary tectonism, is Late Eocene (33.9–38 million years ago).

Estuary
The final  of the Murchison River, from the Murchison House ford to the mouth, are estuarine, and consist of a sequence of long sandbars and shallow pools mostly less than a metre deep. The estuary is permanently open to the sea, so is constantly affected by tides and the inflow of saline sea water. When river flow is low, the estuary accumulates sediment from the ocean, narrowing the river channel; this sediment is evacuated to the ocean during periods of high flow, but high flow also brings sediment into the estuary from upriver. Because of the high sediment load, and continual stirring by wind and river flow, the water is turbid.

The mouth of the estuary is a small delta, closed by a sandbar except for a narrow channel. Although this channel is permanently open, it is usually very narrow and shallow, and so is now dredged every year to allow passage by western rock lobster fishing boats.

History
The Murchison River was named by the explorer George Grey, whose boats were wrecked at its mouth on 1April 1839, during his second disastrous exploratory expedition; the name honours Grey's patron, the Scottish geologist Sir Roderick Murchison. Murchison's advocacy had been essential in securing official support for Grey's Western Australian expeditions.

Murchison House Station, one of the oldest stations in Western Australia, was established by Charles Von Bibra on the banks of the river toward the western end in 1858.

The estuary and river mouth was used as a holiday destination by families from the Galena mines in the 1920s and 1930s, and a military holiday camp was built there during World WarII.

In 1951 the town of Kalbarri was gazetted at the river mouth, and by the end of the 1990s the population was about 2,000. In 1963 the Kalbarri National Park was gazetted, formally protecting the lower reaches of the river, including the gorge.

The Galena Bridge, carrying North West Coastal Highway over the river at Galena, was opened by the Main Roads Department in December 1983.

Flooding
Flooding occurred in 1866 resulting in the Geraldine Mine being drowned; more flooding occurred in 1882.

Roads were cut for up to a fortnight resulting in food shortages in many isolated towns.

Heavy flooding occurred along parts of the river in March 1926 following heavy rains. 15 to 20 men were left stranded at the Three Sister galena mine and had to be rescued by dingy.

Flooding again occurred in 1939 and once more following another significant rain event in February 1945 that resulted in flooding and the old Galena Bridge being swept away, effectively stranding the citizens of Carnarvon. A ferry service was established using a fishing boat. Bananas were the main item that urgently needed to be sent across for transport to market.

Following Cyclone Emma in 2006, much of the catchment area received  of rainfall.

See also
Bilyuin Pool
Murchison Gorge
Pencell Pool
Wooleen Station

References

Further reading
Curry, P.J. et al. (1994) An inventory and condition survey of the Murchison River catchment and surrounds, Western Australia. Department of Agriculture, Western Australia: Technical Bulletin Number 84.  
Western Australia. Dept. of Land Administration. Cartographic Services Branch.(1991) Land systems of the Murchison River catchment and surrounds : map series to accompany W.A. Department of Agriculture technical bulletin no. 84 Map Data: Scale 1:250,000 (E 115° 10′--E 118° 45′/S 25°—S 28° 10′).Notes: Land systems of the Murchison River catchment and surrounds by K.A. Leighton ... [et al.]. Date of survey: 1986-1988. Location maps:Belele, Byro, Cue, Glenburgh, Murgoo, Robinson Range.

Rivers of the Mid West region
Kalbarri, Western Australia